Burkhard von Berlichingen (c.1550–1623) was an imperial councillor at the court of Holy Roman Emperor Rudolph II. He became court councillor of Württemberg in 1579, chancery councillor in 1586, and in 1588 was sent to the imperial court in Prague, where he became imperial councillor. In 1597 he built the north wing of Filseck Castle.

On 25 June 1613 he was condemned to public humiliation and five years imprisonment in Křivoklát Castle for libeling the honour of the Schlick family in pasquils directed at Magdalena Schlick, Countess of Passaun and Weißkirchen.

References

1623 deaths
Politicians of the Holy Roman Empire
Year of birth uncertain
16th-century people of the Holy Roman Empire